The M 152.0 is the most common Czechoslovak diesel motor coach in the Czech Republic and Slovakia. It was designed, manufactured and used in the former Czechoslovakia and now used in the Czech Republic (ČD Class 810) and Slovakia (ZSSK Class 812). It was produced from 1975 to 1982 by Vagonka Studénka.

Both ČD and ZSSK refurbish 810s into newer units, sometimes with smaller repairs and additions that retain the class number, or large refurbishments such as ČD Class 814 or ZSSK Class 813, and have a second modernization since 2018, have been using a marketing name for those trainsets, RegioMouse.

MÁV also operates the type as MÁV Class 117 (formerly designated as "Bzmot"). These were rebuilt with new engines and transmission, and had other refurbishments.

Gallery

References 
 http://www.zeleznicne.info/view.php?cisloclanku=2008010025

Diesel multiple units of the Czech Republic
Train-related introductions in 1975